Thorold Secondary School, often referred to as "TSS," is a public secondary school in Thorold, Ontario, Canada. The school was named after Sir John Thorold, a member of the British Parliament for Lincolnshire, England. Despite its moderate size, the school consistently is among the top in the regional athletics for the DSBN.

History
In 1857, a grammar school was established in the village of Thorold, but it was not until 18 years later, in 1875, that the land on which the present high school stands was purchased. The site, bound by Ormond, St. David and Carleton Streets, was purchased for $1856.77 from Dr. Rolls of Thorold, and the building was erected at a cost of $6000. In 1928, a seven-room and gymnasium addition was constructed, and the building was officially opened on the eve of the graduation ceremonies held on November 22, 1929.

Over the years, the school has undergone a series of additions, the most recent of which was in 1967. In 2006, T.S.S. benefited from being part of a Schools Renewal Project. The project involved over $3 million in construction, including new windows and an improved electrical system.

The school has successful athletic programs, despite its relatively small talent pool of just over 600 students. The Golden Eagles Football team has won 5 regional AA/AAA championships competing in the NRHSAA. Thorold Secondary is also highlighted with an outstanding Arts department, with TSS band headlining many charitable concerts, and TSS drama presenting multiple plays. The Golden Eagles Improv team competes in the Canadian Improv Games, and ranked in the Top 10 at the 2019 CIG National Competition at the Arts Center in Ottawa.

Recent valedictorians

2019-20 - Lauren Stoddart
2018-19 - Michael Boisvert
2017-18 - Taylor Maddox
2016-17 - Daniel Plumb
2015-16 - Ashley Shale

Awards and accolades
Golden Eagles Football Team
2006, 2007, NHRSAA - A Division Champions
2012 NHRSAA - AA Division Champions
2016, 2018, NHRSAA - Tier II Champions 
2016, 2018, Thorold Teams of the Year

Golden Eagles Basketball
2013-14 Sr Boys - SOSSA Champions
2013-14 Sr Boys - Zone Champions
2014-15 Sr Boys - Zone Champions
2015-16 Sr Girls - Zone Champions

Golden Eagles Improv Team 
2017, 2018, Tri-City Regional Improv - Bronze Medalists
2019, Tri-City Regional Improv - Gold Medalists

References

External links
 District School Board of Niagara

Thorold
High schools in the Regional Municipality of Niagara
1875 establishments in Ontario
Educational institutions established in 1875